Virginia's 9th House of Delegates district is one of 100 seats in the Virginia House of Delegates, the lower house of the state's bicameral legislature. District 9 consists of all of Patrick County, and parts of Franklin and Henry counties. It has been represented by Republican Wren Williams since 2022. 

In 2021, Williams won the Republican nomination against incumbent Charles Poindexter . In the November 2021 general election, he faced Democrat Bridgette Craighead.

District officeholders

Electoral history

References

External links
 

009
Franklin County, Virginia
Patrick County, Virginia
Henry County, Virginia